KEZM (1310 AM) was a radio station licensed to Sulphur, Louisiana. The station served the Lake Charles media market. The station was last owned by Merchant Broadcasting.

KEZM's license was cancelled by the Federal Communications Commission on September 27, 2021.

References

External links
FCC Station Search Details: DKEZM (Facility ID: 36210)
FCC History Cards for KEZM (covering 1954-1979 as KSUL / KIKS / KEZM)

Radio stations established in 1955
EZM
1955 establishments in Louisiana
Radio stations disestablished in 2021
2021 disestablishments in Louisiana
Defunct radio stations in the United States
Defunct mass media in Louisiana